Stephen Harwood Cole (born 1952) is a British schoolmaster, former Head Master of Woodbridge School in Woodbridge, Suffolk, and currently a reporting (lead) inspector for the Independent Schools Inspectorate.

Biography

Born in South London, in 1952, Stephen Cole was educated at Dulwich College and Merton College, Oxford, where he read Physics. He taught at Wellington College, Finham Park School in Coventry and Merchant Taylors' School, in Northwood, London, before becoming Head Master of Woodbridge School between 1994 and 2014. He was for a time acting chief inspector and acting chief executive of, and is currently a reporting (lead) inspector for, the Independent Schools Inspectorate.

He has been chair of governors of various independent schools and was for many years chair of the national committee of the Independent Schools Information Service, is a trustee of the Ipswich and St Edmundsbury Diocesan Multi Academy Trust and a member of the Ministry Review team. Stephen Cole is a keen runner and has run 21 London Marathons, raising over £120,000 for various charities.

References

1952 births
People educated at Dulwich College
Alumni of Merton College, Oxford
Heads of schools in England
Living people